Pamela K. Woodard is an American cardiovascular physician who is the Hugh Monroe Wilson Professor of Radiology at the Mallinckrodt Institute of Radiology. She was elected a Fellow of the American Association for the Advancement of Science in 2022.

Early life and education 
Woodard was born in Newton, Massachusetts. She has said that she wanted to be a physician from the age of four. 

Woodard completed her bachelor's degree at Duke University. She remained at Duke for her medical degree, before moving to the University of North Carolina at Chapel Hill. Woodard was a medical resident at Duke, where she studied blood clots in the lungs. She revealed that these blood clots could be detected by spinal CT scans. She moved to Washington University in St. Louis as a cardiothoracic fellow. Her research considered diagnostic radiology, including positron emission tomography, magnetic resonance imaging and CT scanning.

Research and career 
In 1997, Woodard was appointed to the faculty at Washington University in St. Louis, where she established multi-detector CT scanning as the standard means to diagnose blood clots. Her research has concentrated on translating pre-clinical imaging to patients. She has developed atherosclerosis agents and PET radiotracers. These radiotracers can detect proteins that are associated with plaques, which can cause sudden heart attack and stroke, or monitor blood flow through heart muscles.

Woodard was named the inaugural Hugh Monroe Wilson Professor of Radiology in 2019. In 2021, she was named the Radiological Society of North America Outstanding Researcher of the Year. In 2022, Woodard was elected a Fellow of the American Association for the Advancement of Science.

Selected publications

References 

Year of birth missing (living people)
Living people
People from Newton, Massachusetts
American physicians
Duke University alumni
University of North Carolina at Chapel Hill alumni
Fellows of the American Association for the Advancement of Science
Washington University in St. Louis fellows
Washington University School of Medicine faculty